The 1st Macau International Movie Festival ceremony, presented by the Macau Film and Television Media Association and China International Cultural Communication Center, honored the best films of 2008 and 2009 and took place on December 28, 2009, at Macau Tower, in Macau.

Lan was the biggest winner, receiving two awards (Best Actor and Best Director).

Winners and nominees

References

External links
 1st Macau International Movie Festival Sina

Golden Lotus Awards
Macau
2009 in Macau
Gold